British-Irish girl group The Saturdays have released four studio albums, one compilation album, two extended plays and eighteen singles. The Saturdays were formed in 2007, with a number of different auditions through their management: Frankie Sandford, Rochelle Wiseman, Una Healy, Mollie King and Vanessa White were the successful auditionees and were granted a place within the band.

The Saturdays made their chart debut in July 2008 with "If This Is Love", which reached the top ten in the United Kingdom. Its follow-up single "Up," released in October 2008, debuted at number five on the UK Singles Chart. To date the single has sold over 345,000 copies in the UK alone and stayed in the charts for 30 weeks. The band's debut studio album, Chasing Lights (2008) reached the top ten on the UK Albums Chart and received a Platinum selling status by the British Phonographic Industry (BPI). The album also saw the release of top ten singles on the UK Singles Chart—"Issues" and "Just Can't Get Enough". "Work" was the final single to be released from Chasing Lights.

Wordshaker (2009) was the band's follow-up studio album and also charted within the top ten on the UK Albums Chart and went on to gain a Silver-selling status, with singles "Forever Is Over" and "Ego" charting within the top ten on the UK Singles Chart. Headlines! (2010) was released as the band's first EP and charted at number three on the UK Albums Chart and number ten on the Irish Album Chart. Headlines! saw the release of top ten singles "Missing You" and "Higher" which features guest vocals from Flo Rida. Both singles became massive commercial successes for the band with "Higher" spending 20 weeks on the chart. The Saturdays' third studio album, On Your Radar (2011) contained three highly successful selling singles, two of which—"Notorious" and "All Fired Up" charted within the top ten on the UK Singles Chart. "My Heart Takes Over" was also released from On Your Radar.

In 2012, the band signed a US deal with Mercury Records, and released an extended play, Chasing the Saturdays in the United States and Canada only. The EP consisted of songs previously released by the group in the UK, and also included the new single "What About Us" featuring Sean Paul. The song failed to gain success in the US, but following the song's release in the UK in March 2013, "What About Us" became a big hit. It went straight to No. 1, becoming their first number one single, and was the fastest-selling single of 2013. The band's next single, "Gentleman" did not manage to repeat the band's success, peaking at No. 14 in the UK. The Saturdays later announced the name of their fourth studio album, Living for the Weekend, released on 14 October 2013. The album was preceded by single "Disco Love", which reached No. 5 in the UK, while the album reached No. 10 on the UK albums chart.

Albums

Studio albums

Compilation albums

Box set

Extended plays

Singles

Guest appearances
These songs have not appeared on a studio album or a single released by The Saturdays.

Videography

Video albums

Music videos

References

General

Specific

External links
Official website
 

Discographies of British artists
Pop music group discographies
Discography